The Hebrew Academy of the Five Towns and Rockaway (HAFTR) is a Modern Orthodox Jewish day school on the South Shore of Long Island in New York, United States, serving male and female students in preschool through twelfth grade. It is a private school in the Five Towns.

History 
HAFTR was founded in 1978, the result of a merger between two schools on the South Shore of Long Island. Its predecessors were the Hebrew Institute of Long Island in Far Rockaway, Queens, and the Hillel School.

The Hebrew Institute of Long Island served the Rockaway and Five Towns community since about 1936. It was originally known as The Yeshiva of the Rockaways, then located in a synagogue in Averne. A few years later, it took over a children's home on Seagirt Boulevard in Far Rockaway. The school later bought the neighboring Roche estate and United States hotel grounds (which had contained the summer homes of, inter alia, New York State governor Alfred E. Smith, and Manhattan Borough President, Justice Julius Miller), extending the facility to a five-building campus. The high school, founded in 1951, moved into the final campus building in 1953. Yeshiva Darchei Torah took over the old Hebrew Institute campus after the merger.

The Hillel School was founded in Lawrence in 1957.

The foundation of HAFTR provided a co-educational school for Jewish families in the area. In 1980, HAFTR purchased the Number 3 school in Cedarhurst, New York, to house the  HAFTR High School.

On January 10, 2019 a fire damaged the HAFTR elementary school campus in Lawrence, New York, and students were temporarily taught at other HAFTR campuses. The campus reopened in April 2019 after the building was renovated.

During the COVID-19 pandemic, the HAFTR schools temporarily ended in-person classes, and later implemented further sanitation protocols to prevent the potential spread of COVID.

The HAFTR High School hosted the 2021 Center for Initiatives in Jewish Education Robotics Tournament.

Community 
The school has held annual bone marrow drives. The school is also a participant in the Salute to Israel Parade.

Academics 
Approximately 100 students graduate HAFTR annually, 100% of which go on to attend college after graduation. The school has various clubs including ones for robotics, environmental action, sign language and other activities.

Athletics
The academy offers basketball, soccer, hockey, baseball, softball, tennis and volleyball, all for both girls and boys. The head of athletics is Joey Hoenig. All HAFTR athletics use the name "The Hawks," though the hockey team formerly competed under the name "The Flames."

Publications

The official student newspaper of HAFTR High School is The Tattler. Established more than 30 years ago, the stories featured in the publication are written, photographed and edited by HAFTR students.

Recently, HAFTR students and rabbinic faculty alike, re-founded the HAFTR Haftorah: A judaic publication, focused around major Jewish holidays and includes Divrei Torah, whats happening around the school, and Judaism inspired art.

Notable alumni

 Robby Berman, wrote the first book ever published on Arabic Idioms in the Palestinian Dialect.
 Paula (Finkelstein) Eiselt, director of 93QUEEN, a documentary featuring Rachel Freier
 Deborah Lipstadt (HILI), Holocaust historian and expert on antisemitism
 Alana Newhouse (HAFTR), editor of Tablet magazine
 Jacob Steinmetz (HAFTR), first Orthodox-Jewish Major League Baseball-drafted player
 Daniel Wise, mathematician

References

External links
HAFTR homepage
Data for Hebrew Academy of the Five Towns and Rockaway, National Center for Education Statistics

Private elementary schools in New York (state)
Private high schools in New York (state)
Private middle schools in New York (state)
Modern Orthodox Jewish day schools in the United States
Jewish day schools in New York (state)
Educational institutions established in 1978
Schools in Nassau County, New York
1978 establishments in New York (state)